Ida Galli is an Italian film actress best known for her roles in Spaghetti Western and giallo films in the 1960s and 1970s. Galli has appeared under several pseudonyms, including Arianna, Evelyn Stewart and Isli Oberon.

Extremely prolific, some of her most notable roles include La Dolce Vita (1960), Hercules in the Haunted World (1961), The Leopard (1963), The Whip and the Body (1965), Blood for a Silver Dollar (1965), Adiós gringo (1965), Django Shoots First (1966), Special Mission Lady Chaplin (1966), The Sweet Body of Deborah (1968), The Weekend Murders (1970), The Case of the Scorpion's Tail (1971), The Bloodstained Butterfly (1971), Knife of Ice (1972), The Murder Mansion (1972), Footprints on the Moon (1975), and The Psychic (1977).

Life and career
Ida Galli was born in Sestola, Emilia-Romagna, Italy. Her date of birth has variously been given as 9 April 1942 and 8 October 1939. After finishing school, Galli moved to Rome to find work as an actress. Galli's first film appearance was in 1959, under the pseudonym Arianna, in Nel blu dipinto di blu, directed by Piero Tellini. This role caught the attention of Federico Fellini, who cast Galli in a small part in his 1960 film La dolce vita. 

Galli has since appeared in over forty-five film roles. One of her significant roles was the part of Carolina in Luchino Visconti's 1963 film adaptation of the novel Il Gattopardo (The Leopard). She last appeared in 1990's Con i piedi per aria, directed by Vincenzo Verdecchi.

Although her early roles were usually billed under her real name, Galli most often used the pseudonym Evelyn Stewart. However, her role in Mario Bava's 1963 film La frusta e il corpo was credited as Isli Oberon. 

Several of Galli's roles have been in the Spaghetti Western genre, beginning with Un dollaro bucato, Adiós gringo and Perché uccidi ancora in 1965. Galli has also featured in several giallo films, including Lucio Fulci's Sette note in nero, Umberto Lenzi's Il coltello di ghiaccio and Sergio Martino's La coda dello scorpione. Enrico Lancia, author of the Dizionario del cinema italiano series, describes Galli as being at her best in dramatic roles, but notes that her largest success came as a result of adopting the Evelyn Stewart pseudonym and focussing on roles in genre films.

Filmography

Footnotes

References

External links
 

Italian film actresses
Spaghetti Western actresses
Living people
20th-century Italian actresses
Year of birth missing (living people)